The South African cricket team toured England in the 1929 season to play a five-match Test series against England. It was the first tour since 1924, though Tests has been played between the two sides in the interim with the 1927-28 England tour of South Africa.

England won the 1929 Test series, winning two matches with the other three games drawn. In first-class matches overall, the South Africans won nine games and lost seven, with 18 being drawn. There were three non-first-class matches; two of them ended in South African victories, the other was drawn.

The South African team
The side was captained by Nummy Deane and he, Herbie Taylor and Bob Catterall were the only survivors from the 1924 tour. The other members of the team were: Sandy Bell, Jock Cameron, Jim Christy, Eric Dalton, Bruce Mitchell, Denijs Morkel, Quintin McMillan, Arthur Ochse, Tuppy Owen-Smith, Neville Quinn, Jack Siedle, Edward van der Merwe, and Cyril Vincent. Jacobus Duminy was temporarily co-opted on to the tour while on holiday in Europe because of injuries to other players and he played in three first-class matches, including the third Test match. Deane as captain played in 29 of the 34 first-class matches; in the games where Deane was not playing, Taylor acted as captain.

Test series summary

First Test

Second Test

Third Test

Fourth Test

Fifth Test

References

Further reading
 Bill Frindall, The Wisden Book of Test Cricket 1877-1978, Wisden, 1979

External links
 South Africa in England, 1929 at Cricinfo
 South Africa in British Isles, 1929 at CricketArchive

Further reading
 Wisden Cricketers' Almanack 1930

1929 in English cricket
1929 in South African cricket
English cricket seasons in the 20th century
International cricket competitions from 1918–19 to 1945
1929